Isaac Peak is a  rock formation in Zion National Park in Washington County, Utah, United States. Access to Isaac Peak is from the main Park road through Sand Beach Trail. Isaac Peak is part of the Three Patriarchs in between Abraham Peak and Jacob Peak. Between Isaac Peak and Abraham Peak is Isaac Canyon, accessed by climbing up the South Fork of Heaps Canyon.

Name
Zion National Park was first named Mukuntuweap National Monument by Geologist John Wesley Powell. Explorer Frederick Samuel Dellenbaugh, a companion to Powell's, illustrated and wrote about the park in Scribner's Magazine, giving publicity to the region. Shortly afterward, Methodist minister Frederick Vining Fisher explored the park along with two Latter-Day Saints youth and among them named many of the peaks in the park. Along with its neighbor peaks, names were chosen from biblical patriarchs. The name for Isaac Peak was suggested by Claud Hirschi, one of the youth with Fisher and named after Isaac.

Climbing routes
Isaac Peak has several recognized rock climbing routes. Tricks of the Trade, also known as Tricks of the Tramp (1,800’, V  C2) located at the base of the main chimney system. Sands of Time is located starting on a prominent crack to the left of Tricks of the Trade (VI  A3). The route climbs the south face of the main buttress although it doesn't complete at the summit. Other routes include Freeloader (V  D) and Iron Like a Lion in Zion (IV/V  b/c).

Isaac Peak is a location identified as a nesting area for raptors and as a consequence, closed for climbing during nesting seasons.

See also

 List of mountains in Utah
 The Watchman (Utah)
 Mount Moroni

References

External links

 Sounds of Time map Illustration of the Sands of Time route to climb Isaac Peak.

Rock formations of Utah
Landforms of Washington County, Utah
Zion National Park